Colom L. Keating is an American actor, author, comedy writer, and creator of the radio personality Mr. Manly.

He has appeared in three films. In 1985 he played a detective in Confessions of a Serial Killer, in 1994 he played a cop in the movie Blank Check, and he played a fireman in the 1998 direct-to-video release One Hell of a Guy.

He is the author of the book The Official Manly Manual.

External links

American male actors
American male writers
Living people
Year of birth missing (living people)
Place of birth missing (living people)